Eric Vanderaerden (born 11 February 1962) is a retired road cyclist from the town of Lummen, Belgium.

He was a considerable talent, winning the prologue time trial of the Vuelta a España in his debut year of 1983. During the 1983 Tour de France he also won the prologue and held the yellow jersey for two days. During the 1984 Tour de France he won two stages, including the final stage of the race which finished on the Champs-Élysées in Paris. His participation in the 1985 edition was a strong one, beating the eventual Tour winner Bernard Hinault in a time trial stage. He held the yellow jersey again during this tour, this time for three days. The following year, he won the green jersey.

In subsequent years, he won two monument races: in 1985, at 23, he won the storm ridden edition of the Tour of Flanders, and in 1987 he won Paris–Roubaix.

After 1988, his career went in decline and, despite his talent, he failed to win major races. He certainly had considerable talent as a time trial racer, but as a climber in the mountains his talent was limited. Perhaps, he was partly a victim of the high expectations the Belgian public had to get a successor for Eddy Merckx, a cyclist who was very versatile in winning both classic races and big stage races.

After his active career, Vanderaerden has led a few semi-professional racing teams and was also assistant-manager of a professional Belgo-Italian team. He became a directeur sportif with the DFL-Cyclingnews-Litespeed team in August 2006. His son Michael Vanderaerden signed a contract with the team in September 2007.

Major results

1983
 Tour de France
1st Prologue
Held  for two days
 Vuelta a España
1st Stages 2 & 11
 3rd Dwars door België
 4th Milan–San Remo
 5th Kuurne–Brussels–Kuurne
1984
 1st  Road race, National Road Championships
 Tour de France
1st Stages 10 & 23
 Tour de Suisse
1st Prologue, Stages 2 & 7
 1st Paris–Brussels
 2nd Overall Three Days of De Panne
 2nd Gent–Wevelgem
 2nd Rund um den Henninger Turm
 3rd Milan–San Remo
 9th Omloop Het Volk
 10th Tour of Flanders
 10th Nokere Koerse
1985
 Tour de France
1st Stages 13 (ITT) & 19
Held  for three days
 1st Tour of Flanders
 1st Gent–Wevelgem
 1st Grand Prix Eddy Merckx
 1st Ronde van Nederland
 1st Stage 5 Tour de Suisse
 2nd Dwars door België
 4th Milan–San Remo
 4th Rund um den Henninger Turm
1986
 1st  Points classification Tour de France
 1st  Overall Three Days of De Panne
 1st Halle–Ingooigem
 1st Dwars door België
 1st E3 Prijs Vlaanderen
 1st Trofeo Isla de Mallorca
 3rd Scheldeprijs
 10th Tour of Flanders
1987
 1st  Overall Three Days of De Panne
 1st Paris–Roubaix
 1st Grand Prix Eddy Merckx
 2nd Milan–San Remo
 3rd Tour of Flanders
 5th Omloop Het Volk
 8th Gent–Wevelgem
1988
 1st  Overall Three Days of De Panne
 1st Ronde van Limburg
1989
 1st  Overall Three Days of De Panne
 1st  Overall Nissan Classic
 1st GP Impanis
 1st Stage 1 Tour de Suisse
 4th Gent–Wevelgem
 5th Omloop Het Volk
1990
 Étoile de Bessèges
1st Stage 2 & 3
 1st Stage 5 Tirreno–Adriatico
 1st Six Days of Antwerp
 2nd Scheldeprijs
 3rd Binche–Tournai–Binche
 8th Omloop Het Volk
 9th Overall Three Days of De Panne
1991
 1st Dwars door België
 2nd Le Samyn
 3rd Milan–San Remo
 4th Gent–Wevelgem
 5th Amstel Gold Race
1992
 1st Stage 17 Vuelta a España
 1st GP Wielerrevue
 2nd Le Samyn
 3rd Omloop Het Volk
 3rd E3 Prijs Vlaanderen
1993
 1st  Overall Three Days of De Panne
 1st Stage 3 Étoile de Bessèges
 2nd Gent–Wevelgem
 3rd Omloop Het Volk
 8th Le Samyn
1995
 4th Scheldeprijs
 6th Paris–Roubaix
1996
 3rd Scheldeprijs

References

1962 births
Living people
Belgian male cyclists
Belgian Tour de France stage winners
Belgian Vuelta a España stage winners
Tour de France prologue winners
Tour de France Champs Elysées stage winners
Tour de Suisse stage winners
Cyclists from Limburg (Belgium)
People from Lummen